Solodcha is a rural locality (a settlement) in Alexandrovskoye Rural Settlement, Ilovlinsky District, Volgograd Oblast, Russia. The population was 24 as of 2010. There are 12 streets.

Geography 
The village is located 2 km east from Alexandrovka.

References 

Rural localities in Ilovlinsky District